The Varanasi–Chhapra line or Chhapra–Varanasi line is a railway route on the North Eastern Railway section of Indian Railways. This route plays an important role in rail transportation of Varanasi division and Azamgarh division of Uttar Pradesh state and Saran division of Bihar state.

History
This line was opened in different phases during the construction period.

 The first phase, between Chhapra Junction to Revelganj halt was opened on 15 April 1891.
 The second phase, between Revelganj Halt to Manjhi was opened on 1 April 1899.
 The third phase, between Manjhi to Bakulha was opened on 7 February 1912.
 The fourth phase, between Bakulha to Ballia was opened on 12 May 1899.
 The fifth phase, between Ballia to Phephna Junction was opened on 13 March 1899.
 The Sixth phase, between Phephna Junction to Ghazipur Ghat was opened on 10 March 1903.
 The Seventh Phase, between Ghazipur Ghat to Aunrihar Junction was opened on 15 March 1909.
 The Eighth Phase, between Aunrihar Junction to Varanasi City was also opened on 15 March 1909.

Whereas the branch line between Aunrihar Junction to Phephna Junction was opened in two phases during the construction period. The First phase between Aunrihar Junction to Mau Junction was opened on 15 March 1899 and the second phase between Indara Junction to Phephna Junction was also opened on 15 March 1899.

After that, this line was transferred from the initial jurisdiction to Oudh Tirhut Railway, after the amalgamation of: Bengal and North Western Railway, the Tirhut Railway, Mashrak-Thawe Extension Railway, Rohilkund and Kumaon Railway Company on 1 January 1943.

Later, on 14 April 1952, this line was transferred to the jurisdiction of North Eastern Railway, after the amalgamation of Oudh Tirhut Railway and Assam Railway Company.

After that, the conversion into  broad gauge was completed through different phases starting from the first phase between Varanasi City to Indara Junction at 1990, and the second phase between Aunrihar Junction to Chhapra Junction at 1996 and the another phase between Indara Junction to Phephna Junction at 1999.

Electrifiction
The electrification trial and inspection on Varanasi–Chhapra line was completed in December 2018.

List of trains Passing through this line

Main
 Lichchavi Express
 Chhapra–Lucknow Junction Express
 Ganga Kaveri Express
 Swatantra Senani Express
 Darbhanga–Varanasi City Antyodaya Express
 Sadbhavna Express (via Sitamarhi)
 Sadbhavna Express (via Sagauli)
 Loknayak Express
 Tapti Ganga Express
 Dr. Ambedkar Nagar–Kamakhya Weekly Express
 Pawan Express
 Dibrugarh–Amritsar Express
 Harihar Express
 Sarnath Express
 Barauni–Gondia Express
 Chhapra–Varanasi City Intercity Express
 Dibrugarh Rajdhani Express
 Raxaul–Lokmanya Tilak Terminus Antyodaya Express

Branch
 Chauri Chaura Express
 Gorakhpur–Manduadih Intercity Express
 Kashi Express
 Gorakhpur–Pune Weekly Express
 Bapu Dham Superfast Express
 Durg–Nautanwa Express (via Varanasi)
 Krishak Express
 Shalimar (Howrah) Express

References

Transport in Varanasi district
Transport in Chhapra
Rail transport in Uttar Pradesh
Rail transport in Bihar
5 ft 6 in gauge railways in India
Varanasi railway division